The 2013 Dubai Duty Free Darts Masters was the inaugural staging of the tournament by the Professional Darts Corporation, as a first entry in the new World Series of Darts. The tournament featured the top 8 players according to the Order of Merit, competing in a knockout system. The tournament was held at the Dubai Tennis Centre in Dubai over 23–24 May 2013.

Michael van Gerwen won the title, defeating fellow Dutchman Raymond van Barneveld 11–7 in the final.

Qualifiers
The top eight on the PDC Order of Merit after the 2013 World Championship qualified for the event, with the top 4 seeded. These were:

  Phil Taylor (Quarter-finals)
  Adrian Lewis (Quarter-finals)
  James Wade (Semi-finals)
  Michael van Gerwen (Winner)
  Simon Whitlock (Quarter-finals)
  Andy Hamilton (Semi-finals)
  Wes Newton (Quarter-finals)
  Raymond van Barneveld (Runner-up)

Prize money
The total prize fund was $245,000.

Draw

Broadcasting
This event was shown live in the United Kingdom and Europe by Eurosport.

References

External links
The official PDC page for the Dubai Duty Free Darts Masters

Dubai Duty Free Darts Masters
Dubai Duty Free Darts Masters
Dubai Duty Free Darts Masters
World Series of Darts